José Maria de Carvalho Sales (born 3 December 1931), known as Zé Maria, is a Brazilian footballer. He played in three matches for the Brazil national football team in 1959. He was also part of Brazil's squad for the 1959 South American Championship that took place in Ecuador.

References

External links
 

1931 births
Living people
Brazilian footballers
Brazil international footballers
Association footballers not categorized by position